Pázmánd is a village in Fejér county, Hungary. As of 2004, it had 2,015 residents.

Gallery

External links 

 Street map 

Populated places in Fejér County